Otakar Německý (2 March 1902 – 18 March 1967) was a Czechoslovakian Nordic skier who competed in Nordic combined and cross-country skiing in the 1920s.

He was born in Nové Město na Moravě. He was the younger brother of Josef Německý.

Německý won three medals at the FIS Nordic World Ski Championships with golds in the 18 km and Nordic combined (1925) and a silver in the Nordic combined (1927).

At the 1928 Winter Olympics he finished 16th in the 18 kilometre cross-country skiing event and ninth in the Nordic combined competition.

References
 . Cross-country results
 . Nordic combined results

External links 
 
 

1902 births
1967 deaths
Czech male Nordic combined skiers
Czech male cross-country skiers
Czechoslovak male cross-country skiers
Czechoslovak male Nordic combined skiers
Czechoslovak military patrol (sport) runners
Olympic cross-country skiers of Czechoslovakia
Olympic Nordic combined skiers of Czechoslovakia
Cross-country skiers at the 1928 Winter Olympics
Nordic combined skiers at the 1924 Winter Olympics
Nordic combined skiers at the 1928 Winter Olympics
Military patrol competitors at the 1928 Winter Olympics
FIS Nordic World Ski Championships medalists in cross-country skiing
FIS Nordic World Ski Championships medalists in Nordic combined
People from Nové Město na Moravě
Sportspeople from the Vysočina Region